Stephen "Steve" Johns (born 13 October 1965 in Saskatoon, Saskatchewan, Canada) is an Australian curler originally from Canada.

Johns was a member of the Australian team that competed at the 2008 World Men's Curling Championship held in Grand Forks, North Dakota where the team placed sixth.

Johns competed alongside daughter, Veronica Johns, in the Mixed Doubles National Curling Competition in October 2017.

References

External links

1965 births
Living people
Australian male curlers
Curlers from Saskatoon
Pacific-Asian curling champions
Canadian emigrants to Australia